Aberdeen F.C. competed in the Scottish Football League in season 1915–16.

Overview

Despite the First World War in Europe continuing, football continued in Scotland, although the Scottish Cup was suspended for the second season in a row. Aberdeen finished 11th out of 20 clubs in the table. Highlights included an eleven-game undefeated run from November to January. Dave Main finished as the club's top scorer with 15 goals in 32 appearances.

Results

Scottish Football League

Final standings

Scottish Cup

The Scottish Cup was suspended for a second successive season due to the First World War.

Squad

Appearances & Goals

|}

References

Aberdeen F.C. seasons
Aberdeen